Michael Holigan's Your New House is a syndicated home improvement television show which premiered in 1995.  A sister program titled "Your New House with Michael Holigan" premiered on the Discovery Channel (US) in 1998.

Syndication 

Through 2007 "Michael Holigan's Your New House" completed 255 episodes and 10 seasons.

Discovery Channel 

"Your New House with Michael Holigan" completed three seasons consisting of 60 half hour episodes and 100 one hour episodes.

Cast 

In addition to Michael Holigan, other talent has included:

Al Carrell - Super Handyman
Teresa Garrett - Do It Yourself
Steve Easley - Did You Know (Factory Tours)
Steve Greenberg - Check This Out (Gadgets)
Joe Sherinski - Great Outdoors
Sonya McKinney - Quick Tips
Glenn Moray - Fix It Up (Remodeling)

Subjects 
The show covers home construction, improvement and finance with each episode offering a variety of topics instead of a single project.  Several seasons have included a "project house" as a portion of each episode and covered these homes from ground breaking through completion.1

Website 
Each segment has a unique identifier number, and details about the segment of the show related to a project can be looked up online at the Michael Holigan website.  The website also hosts online videos of various show segments.

Parent Company 
According to the website, "Michael Holigan's TV Show and website are part of Holigan Investment Group. In addition to its media properties, Holigan Investment Group specializes in Land Development."

External links

Official Homepage
Holigan Investment Group
Holigan Land Development

1  Project Houses

Home renovation television series